Joseph Howard "Howie" "Rip" Riopelle (January 30, 1922 – September 22, 2013) was a Canadian professional ice hockey forward who played 169 games in the National Hockey League for the Montreal Canadiens. He was born in Ottawa, Ontario.

Riopelle died at his home in Blackburn Hamlet, Ottawa, Ontario in 2013, aged 91.

References

External links
 

1922 births
2013 deaths
Canadian ice hockey forwards
Canadian military personnel of World War II
Montreal Canadiens players
Ice hockey people from Ottawa